In the Hell of Patchinko is a live album by Mano Negra; it was recorded on 2 November 1991 in Club Citta, Kawasaki, Japan with mobile studio "Sound Creaters" and released on 9 November 1992.

This album is dedicated to Marc Police, ex-guitarist of Les Wampas, who committed suicide in December 1991.

Track listing

Personnel
Manu Chao - Lead vocals, guitar
Antoine Chao - Trumpet, vocals
Santiago Casariego - Drums, vocals
Philippe Teboul - Percussion, vocals
Daniel Jamet - Lead Guitar, vocals
Joseph Dahan - Bass, vocals
Thomas Darnal - Keyboards, vocals
Pierre Gauthé - Trombone, vocals

Guest musicians
Chinois:  Vocals (at Track 23)

Certifications

References 

Mano Negra (band) albums
1992 live albums